Prince Aleksei Dmitrievich Saltykov (1806–1859) was a Russian artist and traveller in Persia and India. He was the grandson of Prince Nikolay Saltykov.

Family 
Prince Alexis Soltikoff (as the family name was spelled in his own time) was born in St. Petersburg on 1 February 1806 to Prince Dmitri Nikolaevich Saltykov (1767–1826) and Anna Nikolaevna Leontieva (1776–1810) and had three older brothers (the princes Ivan (1797–1832), Petr (ca. 1804–1889) and Vladimir (ca. 1799–1835) and an older sister Princess Mariya (1795–1823). The Soltykov name was one of the more esteemed in Russia.

Alexis's father Dmitri had two brothers (no sisters): Aleksandr (1775–1837) and Sergei (1776–1828). The three boys were the son of the famous General Nikolai Ivanovich Saltykov (31 October 1736 – 24 March 1816) and Natalya Vladimirovna Dolgorukaya (1737–1812).

Life 
Alexis's early days are somewhat of a mystery. He grew up in St Petersburg and at the age of eighteen joined the diplomatic services with the Russian State Board (Collegium) for Foreign Affairs in Moscow. By the age of 23 he was with the Russian Foreign Service, first in Constantinople, then in Athens, later in London, Florence, Rome, and Teheran. In 1840 Alexis retired and moved to Paris where he planned his voyages to India. He ended up making two voyages there (1841–43 and 1844–46), and achieving the sobriquet 'The Indian' from the Russian and French aristocracy. In 1849 he published a selection of his letters in French accompanied by his drawings, which became very well known in Europe "Lettres sur L’Inde". Paris, 1848).
In 1851 the book was translated into Russian and became an instant success: it truly enraptured the Russian reading public. The drawings were published separately in London in 1859 as "Drawings on the Spot".

The 11th century Gloucester Candlestick was obtained by the V & A  from (a) Prince Soltikoff in 1861 and the John Grandisson Triptych which is now in the British Museum was also once part of the Saltykov collection.

References 

1806 births
1859 deaths
Diplomats of the Russian Empire
Russian writers
Russian artists